Monitoring may refer to:

Science and technology

Biology and healthcare
 Monitoring (medicine), the observation of a disease, condition or one or several medical parameters over time
 Baby monitoring
 Biomonitoring, of toxic chemical compounds, elements, or their metabolites, in biological substances
 Fetal monitoring in childbirth
 Heart rate monitoring
 Intraoperative neurophysiological monitoring
 Monitoring in clinical trials, oversight and administrative efforts that monitor a participant's health during a clinical trial
 Self-monitoring, a psychological term meaning awareness of what one knows

Computing
 Application performance management, also called application performance monitoring, monitoring and management of performance and availability of software applications
 Event monitoring, process of collecting, analyzing, and signaling event occurrences to subscribers such as operating system processes, active database rules as well as human operators
 Business transaction management, also called business transaction monitoring, managing information technology from a business transaction perspective
 Network monitoring, systems that constantly monitors a computer network for slow or failing components and that notifies the network administrator
 System monitoring, a process within a distributed system for collecting and storing state data
 User activity monitoring, the process of recording user input
 Website monitoring, the process of testing and verifying that end-users can interact with a website or web application as expected

Environmental science
 Environmental monitoring, processes and activities that characterise and monitor the quality of the environment
 Participatory monitoring, monitoring of natural resources and biodiversity by local people

Other uses in science and technology
 Condition monitoring, a process for tracking parameters in industrial equipment
 Cure monitoring, for composite materials manufacturing
 Deformation monitoring, measurement and tracking of the alteration in the shape or dimensions of an object as a result of stresses
 Energy monitoring and targeting, an energy efficiency technique

Other uses
 Election monitoring, the observation of an election by one or more independent parties
 Futures monitoring, evaluation of events, as they occur or just afterward
 Media monitoring service, providing clients with copies of media content, which is of specific interest
 Monitoring and evaluation, process that helps improve performance and achieve results in project management
 Wildlife Enforcement Monitoring System (WEMS) Initiative

See also
 Monitor (disambiguation)
 Surveillance, the monitoring or observation of the behaviour or communications of individuals or groups